Greenvalley Public School is an educational institution in Nellikuzhi, Kothamangalam, in the state of Kerala, India. TIt is affiliated to Central Board of Secondary Education, New Delhi, for AISSE (Grade 10) and AISSCE (Grade 12) examinations. It was established in 1996 by Molly Pradeep, late wife of the present director, Pradeep Kuriakose. It has a sister school in Perumbavoor, which provides elementary education.

Academics 
The school has eight periods a day, each around 40 minutes. The school day runs from 9:30 until 3:30. A snack break is held from 10:55-11:00am, lunch break from 12:55-1:20pm, and another short break from 2:45-2:50pm.

The school is open for Mothers' Pride to Grade 12 [Kindergarten to 12th standard] and the age group is from 3 years to 17 years. The school is divided into sub-juniors (kindergarten to III), juniors (III–VI) and seniors (VII-X) and super-seniors (XI and XII) classes.

Facilities 
 Computer laboratory
 Mathematics laboratory
 Biology, physics and chemistry laboratories
 Library with magazines, newspaper and books
 Music, dance, jazz, yoga, sports, karate, drawing, work experience and art and crafts room
 Courts for basketball, tennis, badminton and martial arts
 First aid room with qualified nurses
 Stationery store, providing pens, pencils, books, other basics and uniform clothes
 Clean and hygienic washroom and toilets
 15 school buses

Club system 
All students from classes III to X belong to one of the four clubs. The four clubs with their colours and mascots are:
 Victors - blue, Unicorn
 Legends - green, Lion
 Elites  - red, Dragon
 Leaders - yellow, Horse
Each house is assigned a captain from class X, a vice-captain from class IX and three teachers-in-charge. Each house competes to win the best House Award every year. Inter-house competitions are also held throughout the year starting with floral carpet competitions during Onam celebrations. An inter-house sports tournament is also held, with track and field sports and chess competitions.

School committee 
The director and principal jointly decide a girl and a boy from class XII as head girl and head boy, who represent students in school programmes. The student committee is led by the head boy, the head girl and a sports captain from class XII. The house captains and vice captains are also members of the committee.

Extra-curricular activities 
Extra-curricular activities include football, volleyball, badminton, swimming, drawing/painting, drama, debate and quiz.

Elocution, recitation, quiz and light music are conducted on Arts Day. Indian games including Kho kho and kabaddi are also encouraged.

School programmes 
The school-conducted programmes include an Arts Day, Sports Day, Science/Maths/Computer Fair and celebrations on Christmas and Onam. For entertainment purposes the school conducts an anniversary celebration as well as an excursion. The school's anniversary function has been conducted biennially since 2005. The school also conducts the Kerala Mango Festival, at Ernakulam Town Hall in 2010 and at Kakkanad in 2014. Students from classes VII, VIII, IX and X organise the event under the guidance of the director and principal.

References 

Schools in Ernakulam district
Educational institutions established in 1995
1995 establishments in Kerala